Roscoe, also spelled Rosco or Roscow, may refer to:

People
 Roscoe (name)

Places

United States
Roscoe, California (disambiguation)
Roscoe Township (disambiguation)
Roscoe, Georgia, an unincorporated community
Roscoe, Illinois, a village
Roscoe, Minnesota, a city
Roscoe, Goodhue County, Minnesota, an unincorporated community
Roscoe, Missouri, a village
Roscoe, Montana, a settlement
Roscoe, Nebraska, an unincorporated community and census-designated place
Roscoe, New York, a hamlet
Roscoe, Pennsylvania, a borough
Roscoe, South Dakota, a city
Roscoe, Texas, a town
Roscoe Village, a neighborhood in North Center, Chicago, Illinois
Roscoe Village (Coshocton, Ohio)
Roscoe Independent School District, Texas

Canada
Roscoe River, Nunavut and the Northwest Territories, Canada
Roscoe Glacier, Queen Mary Land, Antarctica

Other uses
 Roscoe's House of Chicken 'n Waffles, a popular California restaurant chain
 Roscoe Wind Farm, Roscoe, Texas
 ROSCO, an acronym for British railway rolling stock companies
 Roscoe (Los Angeles Metro station)
 Roscoe (novel), by William Kennedy
 "Roscoe" (song), a song by Midlake
 "Roscoe" type displacement lubricator, invented by James Roscoe
 Roscoe (software product), a software program used on mainframe computers
 A pistol, particularly a revolver

See also
 Rosko (disambiguation)